The State Board of Elections (SBE) is an independent agency of the U.S. state of Illinois.  The SBE, as an acronym, refers both to the eight-member bipartisan board of directors and to the agency that it oversees.  The members of the SBE, who are appointed by the Governor of Illinois, in turn appoint an executive director who is responsible for the day-to-day management of the agency. The agency is headquartered in the state capital of Springfield, with a second headquarters in Chicago.

In August 2016, the FBI announced that an SBE database containing electoral roll information had been breached by foreign hacker, possibly from Russia. Officials were still investigating whether the hacker was able to change any information in the database. A similar attack was made on a voter database in Arizona.

Responsibilities
The State Board of Elections administers the election laws of the State of Illinois.  In this capacity, it oversees the local election commissions, accepts nominating petitions and certificates of nomination, certifies the names of valid candidates for election, accepts and cross-checks the vote totals reported after Election Day, and accepts financial disclosures from the candidates' campaign committees.

References

External links
 

1973 establishments in Illinois
Government agencies established in 1973
Illinois elections
Election commissions in the United States
Elections